The 2000–01 Stuttgarter Kickers season was the 101st season in the club's football history. In 2000–01 the club played in the 2. Bundesliga, the second tier of German football. The club also has taken part in the 2000–01 edition of the DFB-Pokal.

Squad information

Squad and statistics

Reserve team
Kickers' reserve team finished 11th in the Oberliga Baden-Württemberg and were coached by Marcus Sorg.

External links
 2000–01 Stuttgarter Kickers season at Kickersarchiv.de 
 2000–01 Stuttgarter Kickers season at Weltfussball.de 
 2000–01 Stuttgarter Kickers season at kicker.de 
 2000–01 Stuttgarter Kickers season at Fussballdaten.de 

Stuttgarter Kickers
Stuttgarter Kickers seasons